Nucleoporin 160 (Nup160)  is a protein that in humans is encoded by the NUP160 gene.

NUP160 is 1 of up to 60 proteins that make up the 120-MD nuclear pore complex, which mediates nucleoplasmic transport.[supplied by OMIM]

References

Further reading

External links 
 PDBe-KB provides an overview of all the structure information available in the PDB for Human Nuclear pore complex protein Nup160

Nuclear pore complex